Thierry Alajarin (born June 9, 1967, in Toulouse, France) is a former professional footballer.

External links
Thierry Alajarin profile at chamoisfc79.fr

1967 births
Living people
Footballers from Toulouse
French footballers
Association football forwards
Olympique Alès players
Chamois Niortais F.C. players
Ligue 2 players
Trélissac FC players
Balma SC players
Rodez AF players
Blagnac FC players